Winning: The Racing Life of Paul Newman is a 2015 documentary directed by Adam Carolla and Nate Adams. It is based on the book by the same name written by Mat Stone and Preston Lerner The film chronicles the 35 year car racing career of Paul Newman and his racing life as both a driver and owner.

Release
The film premiered on April 16, 2015, in Los Angeles. It was released in theaters and video-on-demand on May 8, 2015.

References

External links

2015 films
Documentary films about auto racing
Documentary films about actors
American auto racing films
American sports documentary films
2010s English-language films
2010s American films